Please Help Me, I'm Falling is the title of a recording by American country music singer Hank Locklin, released in 1960. It marks Locklin's first release considered part of the Nashville Sound.

Included are Locklin's previous hit singles "Send Me the Pillow That You Dream On,", "Livin' Alone", "It's a Little More Like Heaven", and "Please Help Me, I'm Falling", all placing in the Country Singles Top 10.

Reissues
 Please Help Me, I'm Falling was reissued on CD in 1999 on the Charly label.

Track listing

Side one
 "Please Help Me, I'm Falling" (Don Robertson, Hal Blair)
 "My Old Home Town" (Hoyt Johnson, Kermit Barrett)
 "(I'm So Tired of) Goin' Home All by Myself" (Pete Hunter)
 "It's a Little More Like Heaven" (Hoyt Atkins, Jim Atkins)
 "Livin' Alone" (Wayne Walker)
 "Seven Days (The Humming Song)" (Roy Drusky)

Side two
 "Send Me the Pillow That You Dream On" (Hank Locklin)
 "Blues in Advance" (Neil Drummond)
 "Why Don't You Haul Off and Love Me" (Lonnie Glosson, Wayne Raney)
 "When the Band Plays the Blues" (John D. Loudermilk)
 "Hiding in My Heart" (Ken Hodges)
 "Foreign Car" (Lawton Williams)

Personnel
Hank Locklin – vocals, guitar
Grady Martin – guitar
Chet Atkins – guitar
Ray Edenton – guitar
Velma Smith – guitar
Bob Moore – bass
Jerry Byrd – bass
Buddy Harman – drums
Floyd Cramer – piano
Marijohn Wilkin – background vocals
Millie Kirkham – background vocals
The Jordanaires – background vocals

Production
Produced by Chet Atkins

See also
 The Nashville A-Team

External links
 LP Discography web site.
 

2002 albums
Hank Locklin albums
Albums produced by Chet Atkins